Municipal elections were held in Rome on 26–27 May and 9–10 June 2013 to elect the Mayor of Rome and 48 members of the City Council, as well as the fifteen presidents and more than 400 councillors of the 15 municipi in which the municipality is divided. 

In March 2013 the City Council cut down the number of municipi of the city from 19 to 15, reorganizing the local administrative areas. Also the number of the members of the City Council was reduced from 60 to 48.

The outgoing Mayor Gianni Alemanno (PdL) stood in the election for a second term. The centre-left coalition candidate, heart surgeon Ignazio Marino (PD), was chosen by a  multi-party primary election on 7 April 2013. Since none of the candidates obtained the majority of votes on the first round, a second round vote was held on 9–10 June 2013. As a result, Ignazio Marino was elected mayor by a landslide.

The elections saw about 400,000 votes less than the previous municipal elections with one of the lowest turnout ever registered in Rome.

Background
Despite Alemanno had repeatedly stated its intention to hold primary elections to choose the candidate of the centre-right coalition, on 2 September 2012 he announced his intention to run for a second term as Mayor of Rome.

Centre-left primary election
The centre-left coalition decided to hold the primary election on 7 April 2013 to decide its mayoral candidate. There were 6 main candidates: five from Democratic Party and one from Left Ecology Freedom.

Among the most popular candidates there were Ignazio Marino, heart surgeon and senator, who was candidate in the 2009 Democratic Party leadership election; David Sassoli, journalist and MEP since 2009; and Paolo Gentiloni, former Minister of Communication in the Prodi II Cabinet. On 7 April Marino won the election and became the official candidate of the centre-left coalition.

Voting System
The voting system is used for all mayoral elections in Italy, in the city with a population higher than 15,000 inhabitants. Under this system voters express a direct choice for the mayor or an indirect choice voting for the party of the candidate's coalition. If no candidate receives 50% of the votes, the top two candidates go to a second round after two weeks. This gives a result whereby the winning candidate may be able to claim majority support, although it is not guaranteed.

For municipi the voting system is the same, not referred to the mayor but to the president of the municipio.

The election of the City Council is based on a direct choice for the candidate with a preference vote: the candidate with the majority of the preferences is elected. The number of the seats for each party is determined proportionally.

Parties and candidates
This is a list of the major parties (and their respective leaders) which participated in the election.

Results

Municipi election

Reduced from 19 to 15 in March 2013, municipi are governed by a president and a council who are elected by its residents every five years. The municipi frequently cross the boundaries of the traditional, non-administrative divisions of the city.

In this election all 15 municipi were won by the centre-left coalition.

Table below shows the results for each municipio with the percentage for each coalition on the first round:

Table below shows the results for each municipio with the percentage for each coalition on the second round:

Source: Municipality of Rome - Electoral Service

References

Rome municipal election
Rome
Rome
Elections in Rome
2010s in Rome
Rome municipal election